Senator Olds may refer to:

Chauncey N. Olds (1816–1890), Ohio State Senate
Edson B. Olds (1802–1869), Ohio State Senate
Lewis P. Olds, North Carolina State Senate